Miniochoerus is an extinct genus of small oreodont endemic to North America. Fossils have been found only in North Dakota, South Dakota, Nebraska, Montana, and Wyoming.

Species
M. affinis (syn. Merycoidodon platycephalus, M. battlecreekensis, Oreodon coloradoensis, Stenopsochoerus sternbergi)
M. chadronensis (syn. Parastenopsochoerus conversensis, Stenopsochoerus douglasensis, S. reideri)
M. forsythae
M. gracilis
M. starkensis (syn. M. cheyennensis, M. helprini, M. nicholsae, M. ottensi, Platyochoerus hatcreekensis, P. heartensis, Stenopsochoerus berardae, S. joderensis)

Description
 
Typically, there were about the size of a small dog. Their skulls were small and short, compared to other oreodont species, many of which had proportionately large heads. Unlike other oreodont species, they had small canines which would have done little good against foes. The genus arose during the late Eocene, and survived the Late Eocene extinction event, giving rise to a dwarfed lineage during the early Oligocene.

References

Oreodonts
Oligocene even-toed ungulates
Eocene even-toed ungulates
Paleogene mammals of North America
Fossil taxa described in 1956
Prehistoric even-toed ungulate genera